Trillium luteum, the yellow trillium or yellow wakerobin, is a species of flowering plant in the bunchflower family Melanthiaceae with native populations in the Great Smoky Mountains of the United States and surrounding areas.

Description
The large stalkless triple leaves often have grey-green marbling on the surface. It flowers in April-May beneath the bare branches of deciduous trees. After flowering and setting seed it goes dormant in summer, before appearing again in late winter.

Taxonomy
In 1813, Muhlenberg described the yellow-petaled variety Trillium sessile var. luteum, but the taxon was given specific rank (Trillium luteum) by Harbison in 1901. The latter is distinguished from T. sessile by its larger size, the mottling of its leaves, shorter filaments, the color of its petals, and the character of its stigmas. The specific epithet luteum, which means "yellow", refers to the color of its petals.

Distribution
Trillium luteum is endemic to the southeastern United States. It is native to Georgia, Kentucky, North Carolina, and Tennessee. It is especially abundant around Gatlinburg, Tennessee. T. luteum has been widely introduced elsewhere, with known populations in Maryland, Michigan, Ontario, Pennsylvania, South Carolina, and Virginia. (A few disjunct populations of yellow-flowered trilliums in central Alabama have been identified as T. luteum but botanists disagree on this point.) There are hundreds of citizen science observations of T. luteum outside of its natural range, especially in Pennsylvania, Maryland, New York, and Virginia.

The ranges of T. luteum and T. cuneatum generally do not overlap except in Casey County in southern Kentucky, in southeastern Tennessee, and along the Little Tennessee River on the border between Tennessee and North Carolina. Hybrids will be found along these points of contact, which makes identification difficult.

Cultivation
It must be left undisturbed to grow into a large colony. It requires some experience to grow successfully, but nevertheless has gained the Royal Horticultural Society's Award of Garden Merit.

Bibliography

References

External links

 
 Biodiversity Information Serving Our Nation (BISON) occurrence data and maps for Trillium luteum

luteum
Flora of the Southeastern United States
Endemic flora of the United States
Ephemeral plants
Plants described in 1840